is a former Japanese football player.

Playing career
Ito was born in Chiba on 1 October 1970. After graduating from Hosei University, he joined NKK in 1993. Although he played many matches as center back in 1993 season, the club was disbanded end of 1993 season. In 1994, he moved to Yokohama Marinos. However he could hardly play in the match behind Japan national team defender Masami Ihara and Norio Omura. In 1997, he moved to Sanfrecce Hiroshima. He became a regular player and played many matches as center back of three back defense with Kenichi Uemura and Tony Popovic for a long time. In 2001, he moved to FC Tokyo. He played many matches as center back with Sandro in 2001 and Jean in 2002. However he could not play at all in the match for injury in 2003. In 2004, he moved to Oita Trinita. However he could not play at all in the match for injury and he retired end of 2004 season. In July 2005, he came back as player at Regional Leagues club FC Gifu. The club was promoted to Japan Football League from 2007 and he retired end of 2007 season.

Club statistics

References

External links

Profile at biglobe.ne.jp

1970 births
Living people
Hosei University alumni
Association football people from Chiba Prefecture
Japanese footballers
J1 League players
Japan Football League (1992–1998) players
Japan Football League players
NKK SC players
Yokohama F. Marinos players
Sanfrecce Hiroshima players
FC Tokyo players
Oita Trinita players
FC Gifu players
Association football defenders